Pontibacter rugosus  is a Gram-negative, rod-shaped, aerobic and motile bacterium from the genus of Pontibacter which has been isolated from seawater from the Gwangyang Bay in Korea.

References

External links
Type strain of Pontibacter rugosus at BacDive -  the Bacterial Diversity Metadatabase

Cytophagia
Bacteria described in 2016